"Tenderly" / "Flow" is a single by British electronic music duo Disclosure. It was released as a digital download, by Make Mine in the United Kingdom on 30 June 2012. The song has charted in Belgium.

Track listings

Charts

Release history

References

2012 singles
Disclosure (band) songs
Songs written by Guy Lawrence
Songs written by Howard Lawrence